Line 13 may refer to:

Asia
 Line 13 (Beijing Subway), China
 Line 13 (Chengdu Metro), China (under construction)
 Line 13 (Dalian Metro), China
 Line 13 (Guangzhou Metro), China
 Line 13 (Qingdao Metro), China
 Line 13 (Shanghai Metro), China
 Line 13 (Shenzhen Metro), China (under construction)
 Line 13 (Mumbai Metro), India (planned)
 Thomson–East Coast MRT line, number 13, Singapore
 Tokyo Metro Fukutoshin Line, officially line 13, Japan

Europe
 Line 13 (Moscow Metro), or Moscow Monorail, Russia
 Line 13 (Stockholm Metro), a red line, Sweden
 Barcelona Metro line 13, Spain
 Paris Métro Line 13, France
 S13 (ZVV), Zurich, Switzerland

North America
 13 (BMT rapid transit service), New York City, US (defunct)
 SEPTA Route 13, Philadelphia, US

South America
 Line 13 (CPTM), São Paulo, Brazil